90.6 FM Stereo is a community-based radio station based in Vanderbijlpark, South Africa. It broadcasts on 90.6 FM in the Vaal Triangle.

See also
List of radio stations in South Africa

External links
 Gauteng community radio stations

Community radio stations in South Africa
Mass media in Vereeniging